Andranik Adamyan is an Armenian football manager. He was a caretaker manager for the Armenia national team in 2002 and 2003. He also managed Armenian Premier League club Shirak Gyumri and Armenia U-21 team.

References

Armenian football managers
Armenia national football team managers
Year of birth missing (living people)
Living people